This is an alphabetical list of populated places in Afghanistan, including hamlets, villages, towns, and other small or rural communities. For urban areas and cities, and other densely populated places, see list of cities in Afghanistan. Provinces and districts are listed at their respective articles.

A 

Ab Bala
Āb Band
Ab Barik
Ab Gaj
Ab Khvor
Ab Khuda'i
Ab Kolok
Ab Mazar
Ab-e Barik-e Qowdi
Ab-Kol
`Abbas Koshteh
Abdan-e Shebaqli
Abi Jan
Abshar
Abtu
Adineh Masjed
Ahangaran
Ajar
Ajrim
Ak Bolak
Ak Toba
Akhshay
Akhjar
Al Farouq training camp
`Ali Gol
'Aliabad
Alikhel
Alim Dara
Almaytū
`Ambar Samuch
Amrakh
Amrud
Amurn
Andkhoy
Andowj
Anguri
Anjuman
Anjuman-i-Khurd
Anvah-ye Kalan
Ao Barik
Aodan
Aq Gonbaz
Aq Robat
Aqcha
Aqina
Arakht
Aranji
Araq-e `Olya
Arigh Batur
Arg-e Zari
Arghandakan
Artin Jelow
Asgharat
Ashkasham
Ashnam
Asqalan
Av Darreh 
Av Par
Aybak, Helmand
Aybak, Samangan
Azad
Azan
Azaw

Top of page

B

Ba Khersak
Babula'i
Bagag
Bagh-e Bala
Baghala
Bagram
Bahador Khani
Baharestan
Bakharow
Bala Bowkan
Bala Deh
Bala Duri-ye Avval
Bala Duri-ye Dovvom
Bala Kuh
Baladay
Balkh
Baluchi, Balkh
Balūchī, Helmand
Balūchī, Herat
Balūchī, Orūzgān
Balūchī, Sar-e Pol
Banaq
Band-e Sheram
Band-e Shuy
Banow
Baraki
Baraqi
Barfak
Barigah
Barik Juy
Barik-e `Olya
Barik-e Sofla
Barikak
Barkah
Bariki
Baryavan
Basenj
Bashanabad
Bast
Bastukbacheh
Batob
Bauragai
Bawragai
Bawrchi
Bawshi
Bay Malasi
Bay Saqal
Bay Temor
Baya
Bayanan
Bayani
Baybacheh
Baybul
Bayram
Bayri
Baza'i Gonbad
Bazar-e Taleh
Bazartu
Bazgir
Bekhe Qada
Berana
Beygshahr
Birimak
Bia Mordeh
Bid Qowl Bala
Bid-e Kalan
Bid-i Khvah
Bidak
Bidqowl
Binisang
Biraneh
Bolagh Tughaneh
Bolagh-e Sabz
Boland Dival
Bolowleh
Boria Bal
Bowz Arigh
Boz Darreh
Bozba'i
Bum
Bum-e Shebar

Top of page

C

Cawgay
Chahar Dar
Chahar Kent
Chahar Mahalleh
Chahi
Chakaran
Chakari
Chakav
Chalas
Cham Qal`eh
Chaman-e Bid
Chapchal
Char Bagh
Char Bulak
Char Kateh
Chap Qowlak
Char-e-Anjir
Chasnud-e 'Olya
Chehel Gazi
Chehel Tan
Chemtal 
Chenaran
Cheshmeh-ye Duzakh
Cheshmeh-ye Shafa
Cheshmeh-ye Shir
Cheshmeh-ye Yanbolaq
Chosnukel
Chub Bash

Top of page

D

Dahan-e Av Par
Dahan-e Baghdarreh
Dahan-e Chahar Deh
Dahan-e Darreh Chasht
Dahan-e Dival
Dahan-e Do Laneh
Dahan-e Eshposhteh
Dahan-e Fatu
Dahan-e Jow Palal
Dahan-e Jowkak
Dahan-e Kanak
Dahan-e Karkareh
Dahan-e Khawal
Dahan-e Khoshkak
Dahan-e Koklan
Dahan-e Mad
Dahan-e Shibar
Dahan-e Siahqowl
Dahan-e Valian
Dahaneh
Dahaneh-ye Ghowri
Daki
Dalak
Dali
Dara
Darabad
Darghani
Darmadar
Darmarakh
Darreh Javay
Darreh-ye Altamur
Darreh-ye Awd
Darreh-ye Bum
Darreh-ye Darvazeh
Darreh-ye Jalmesh
Darreh-ye Joval
Darreh-ye Jow Qowl
Darreh-ye Kajak
Darreh-ye Navora
Darreh-ye Pay Nav
Darreh-ye Pishkan
Darreh-ye Shu
Darreh-ye Suf
Darvishan
Dasht Qal`eh
Dasht-e Borsoneh
Dasht-e Margo
Dasht-e Sachak
Dasht-e Sefid
Dashtak
De Loy Wiyaleh Kelay
De Mulla Samandar Sahib Kelay
Deh Bala
Deh Berenj Qal`eh
Deh Deraz
Deh Gholaman
Deh Hezareh
Deh Now
Deh Sorkh
Deh-e Salah
Dehdadi
Dehestan
Delak
Delek
Dewlak
Derunta training camp
Div Khaneh
Div Khaneh-ye Bala
Div Khaneh-ye Pa'in
Dival
Divalak-e `Olya
Dīvāneh
Do Ab
Do Ab-e Mikh-e Zarrin
Do Abi
Do Ru
Do Shakh
Dogor Gunt
Dugh Ghalat
Dughabad
Dogor Gunt
Dokani
Dowshi
Dow Ab
Dowlatabad, Balkh
Dowra'id
Dudgah
Duraj
Durman
Dushi

Top of page

E

Eg
Elasayel
Emam Sahib
Erganah
Eshkashem
Eshmorgh
Eskan
Eskar
Eskatul
Eslām Chūngar
Espandi 'Olya

Top of page

F

Faqiran
Far Ghambowl
Farghamiru
Farghamu
Fatmasti
Folowl-e Bala
Folowl-e Pa'in
Fotur

Top of page

G

Galleh Chaghar
Ganji
Gardan Deh
Gardan Kichah
Garm Bolagh
Gawaki
Gaz Khan
Gelak
Gerd Deh
Ghandak
Ghar Javin
Gharbi
Ghargharreh
Gharji
Gharmeh
Ghonvar
Ghorak
Ghormach
Ghowch
Ghowch Naveh
Ghowchak
Ghowjurak
Ghowrayd Gharami
Ghuch Zamin
Ghulam Nabi Kelay
Ghumay
Girdi Kas
Girishk
Giru Qowl
Godri
Golkhaneh
Golzar Kalay
Gonbad
Gonbad-e Pa'in
Gow Darreh
Gowri Sukhteh
Gowritik
Gowshak
Gulakai Kot
Gulbahar
Gur-e Mar
Gustaw

Top of page

H

Hasan Khēl
Hasan Tal
Hazar Cheshmeh
Hazareh Toghay
Hazrat-e Sa`id
Hesar
Hesarak
Heydarabad
Hojm-e Bala
Hojm-e Pa'in
Howz-e Shah-e Bala
Howz-e Shah-e Pa'in

Top of page

I

Ilakah
Ilbak
Imam Rabat
Imam Sahib
Ingishkah
Ir Bolagh
Isari
Iskar
Islam Pinjah
Islam Qala
Islam Towarabaf
Ispin Kai
Istoway
Istowi

Top of page

J

Jamarj-e Bala
Jandar Gol-e `Olya
Jandar Gol-e Sofla
Jang `Ali
Jang Righ
Jarf
Javqol
Jawand
Jermatu
Jim Qal`eh
Jowkar
Jowlan
Jowzari
Jorm
Jow Kham
Jow Palal
Jow Qowl
Juy Vakil
Juy-ye `Arab
Juy-ye Shadi

Top of page

K

Ka Chona
Kadalak
Kadanak
Kafsh Andaz
Kahmard
Kaj Ab
Kakan
Kal Qal'ah
Kalakan
Kalan Eylgah
Kalat
Kalokh
Kam Piri
Kamar
Kamarak
Kamati
Kandeh Sang
Kangurchi
Kangur
Kar-Mulla
Kariz-e Zaman-e Bala
Kariz-e Zaman-e Kalgandi
Kariz-e Zaman-e Pa'in
Karkat
Kashkandyow
Katah Khak
Katok
Katway
Kawida
Kayan
Keligan
Keshem
Keshendeh-ye Bala
Keshendeh-ye Pa'in
Khair Khāna
Khak Dow
Khak-e Babeh
Khak-e Cheghel
Khal Khan
Khalamad
Khalden training camp
Kham-e Ganak
Khan Abad
Khandud
Khaneh-ye Garmatek
Khaneqa
Khaneqah
Khar Bid
Khar Kat-e Bala
Khar Mordeh-ye Pa'in
Khar Qowl
Kharat
Khayrabad
Khash Darreh
Khashpak
Khaval
Khazget
Khenjan
Khevaj
Kheyr Khaneh
Kheyrabad, Badakhshan
Kheyrabad, Balkh
Khinjan
Kholm
Khombok
Khoshk Darreh
Khoshk Qowl
Khoshkak
Khughaz
Khuk-e Koshteh
Khvajeh Owlia'
Khvajeh Hasan
Khvajeh Jeyran
Khvajeh Kowshah
Khvajeh Owlia'
Khvajeh Qalandar
Khvolah
Khvosh Asia
Khvosh Margh
Khwahan
Kil Bastalah
Kogel Say
Koshk-e Kohneh
Kowarzan
Kowkcha'il
Kowlian
Kowri
Kowtkay
Kucheh-ye Zard
Kuh Gaday
Kulan
Kuran wa Munjan
Kushgag
Kushk
Kushka
Kushkak

Top of page

L

Ladu
Laghar Juy
Lagharak
Lala Kheyl
Lalma
Landay
Langar, Badakhshan
Langar, Bamyan
Langar Khaneh-ye Kalan
Lar-e Gari
Laron
Larow

Top of page

M

Ma`dan-e Karkar
Madraseh
Madud
Magh Nawul
Mah-e Now
Mahajer
Mahmud-i-Raqi
Malek Military Center
Malestan
Mangan
Mashhad
Mashorey
Maymey
Mazar
Meymik
Meydan
Mian Deh
Mina Do
Mina Vad
Mir Qasem
Miranza'i
Mirkan
Mirza Olang
Mizak
Munji, Afghanistan
Muqur
Murichaq
Musa Qala

Top of page

N

Na`man
Nahr-e Shahi
Nahrin District
Nakhjirabad
Nani
Nav
Navarid Qipchaq
Nawa
Nawzad
Nechkah
Nesharv
Nilan
Nim Lik
North Salang
Now Abad
Nowabad-e Ish
Nusay

Top of page

O

Onab
Onay
Orgun
Owghlan
Owtah Kol

Top of page

P

Pa'in Bowkan
Pa'in Shahr
Padeh-ye Laghari
Padeh-ye Nowkdari
Pahlavan Tash
Pajwar
Pak
Panam
Panjab
Park
Parvareh
Pas-e Pashar
Pashmi Qal`eh
Patukh
Peshi Puza
Peykam Darreh
Pitab
Pitav
Powkowy

Top of page

Q

Qades
Qal`eh-ye Mirza Shah
Qal`eh-ye Bar Panj
Qal`eh-ye Vali
Qal`eh-ye Nowak
Qal`eh-ye Panjeh
Qala i Naw
Qala Wust
Qalacha
Qandahari
Qarah Tappeh
Qarchi Gak
Qawme Dehqan
Qazan, Balkh
Qazi Deh
Qeshlaq Khas
Qeshnehabad
Qezel Kand, Afghanistan
Qila Niazi
Qowl Taq
Qowland
Qurchi

Top of page

R

Ragh
Ravenj
Regay
Robat-e Payan
Rokowt
Rom
Rowchun

Top of page

S

Sabzi Bahar
Sakhari
Sandal 
Sang Ab
Sangar
Sangbor 
Sangborran
Sanglich
Sar Ab
Sar Shakh 
Sar-i Sang
Sarhadd
Sast
Sayyad 
Sefid Darreh
Seh Kushk
Sel Don 
Senjetak
Shadian
Shah Anjir
Shah-e Pari
Shahab od Din
Shahidan
Shahr-e Arman
Shahr-e Bozorg 
Shahr-e Monjan 
Shahran
Shakar Dara
Shashan
Shekastegan
Shekiban
Sher Khan Bandar
Shighnan
Shindand
Shingan
Shirabad
Shirin Tagab District
Shiveh
Shkharow
Shkhawr
Sholoktu 
Shur Areq
Shortepa District
Shorshoreh
Showrak
Shulgareh
Shurab 
Siah Gerd
Siah Chub Kalay
Skazar 
Som Darreh 
Suduj
Surkhrud

Top of page

T

Tagab
Tagab Robat
Taghan Aregh
Taghir Pata
Takaka
Takht-e Ghowrmach
Takhteh Pol
Taleh va Barfak
Talkhian
Tall-e Mir Ghazi
Tandurak
Tang
Tani
Tarang
Tarnak Farms
Tash Gozar 
Tazraq
Temorak Navarid
Teylan
Teshkan
Tojg
Tokhom Geldi
Torghundi
Townj
Tozhna-i-Nasiri
Tupchi

Top of page

U

Uch Drag
Umowl
Urgand
Urgun 
Urup
Ushkan

Top of page

V

Vakhshak
Vazirabad
Vazit 
Vod Ab
Volar 

Top of page

W

Waghjan
Wali
Wandian
Warg
Watarmah-ye Pa'in
Woring
Wusan

Top of page

Y

Yakah Darakht
Yakawlang
Yakh Karez
Yakhak
Yakhan-e 'Ulya
Yakhdan
Yalur
Yaram-e Sofla
Yardar
Yasich
Yasif 
Yavarzan
Yaka Bagh

Top of page

Z

Zadian
Ẕāheṟ Khūnē
Ẕāmi Kalay
Zangerya
Zar Khan
Zargaran
Ziak
Zin
Zinjaren
Zir-e Pol-e Juy

Top of page

See also

List of cities in Afghanistan

Afghanistan
Afghanistan geography-related lists
Populated places in Afghanistan
Geography of Afghanistan